Rainy Lake is a lake on the border between Ontario, Canada, and Minnesota, United States.

Rainy Lake may refer to:

Rainy Lake (Moira drainage basin), a lake in Ontario, Canada
Rainy Lake (Snake Creek drainage basin), a lake in Ontario, Canada
Rainy Lake, Minnesota, an unorganized territory in Minnesota, United States

See also
Rainy Lake Falls, in Washington state
Rainy Lake and River Bands of Saulteaux, a First Nations group in Minnesota and Ontario